Charlie Will Bell III (born March 12, 1979) is an American professional basketball coach and former player who is the head coach of Flint United of The Basketball League (TBL). He played college basketball for Michigan State, and then played parts of eight seasons in the NBA. He also served as an assistant coach for the Iowa Wolves of the NBA G League. and as an assistant coach for the Texas Legends of the NBA G League.

High school
Bell began playing basketball at Flint Southwestern Academy High School, in Flint, Michigan.

College career
Bell had an excellent college basketball career at Michigan State, appearing in three NCAA Final Fours, and being named Michigan State Defensive Player of the Year, in each of the four years he played there.

Professional playing career
Bell wasn't selected in the NBA draft, but he was signed by the Phoenix Suns, on July 23, 2001, as a free agent, and played five games for them. After being released by the Suns, he signed with the Phoenix Eclipse of the ABA and played four games for them. He initially signed a 10-day contract with the Dallas Mavericks on January 10, 2002, and was then signed for the remainder of the season on January 15, but only appeared in two games.

After a rather brief stint in the NBA, Bell took his career to Europe to play in the Italian and Spanish Leagues where he was regarded as a star. In March 2002, he signed with Benetton Treviso, of the Italian League, and he won the Italian League championship with Treviso. In the 2002–03 season, he played with Virtus (Kinder) Bologna, but he was injured in December 2002, and was sidelined for most of the season. In August 2003, he signed with Mabo Livorno, also of the Italian League. In July 2004, he signed with Leche Rio Breogan Lugo, of the Spanish League, and he was named to the All-Spanish League First team for the 2004–05 season. He was also the top scorer of the Spanish league, and he was a three time Spanish League player of the month.

Bell signed with the Milwaukee Bucks for the 2005–06 season, and on March 28, 2006, had his best performance since entering the league, recording his first career triple-double in the Bucks' 132–110 win over the Suns. Bell had then-career highs of 19 points, 13 assists, and 10 rebounds to lead Milwaukee. Bell, who played only seven games in his prior NBA season in 2001–02, appeared in 59 games (starting in six) for the Bucks in the 2005–2006 regular season, and finished with averages of 8.4 points, 2.2 assists, and 2.0 rebounds in 21.7 minutes per game. That postseason, Bell led the Bucks in scoring with a postseason career-high 13 points in 24 minutes of playing time during their first game, a 92-74 Game 1 loss to the Detroit Pistons. The Bucks would end up losing the series four games to one.

The following season, to 13 points, 3 rebounds and 3 assists per games in 35 minutes on average, while appearing in all 82 games.

On September 17, 2007, being a restricted free agent, Bell signed an offer sheet from the Miami Heat worth $18,500,000 over five years. Although he stated that he did not want to play for Milwaukee, they decided to match the offer three days later.

On June 22, 2010, Bell, along with Dan Gadzuric, was traded to the Golden State Warriors for Corey Maggette. He was waived by the Warriors under the amnesty clause prior to the 2011–12 NBA season.

Bell's final NBA game was on February 22, 2011 in a 93 - 115 loss to the Boston Celtics where Bell played for only 2 minutes and recorded no stats.

In January 2012, he signed with Pepsi Caserta.

Coaching career
On November 3, 2016, Bell was hired by the Texas Legends of the NBA Development League to be an assistant coach. Later, Bell was hired by the Iowa Wolves to become an Assistant Coach, this is where he will be for a few years.

On November 16, 2020, Bell was hired by Flint United of The Basketball League to be their inaugural head coach.

Off the court
Bell stars in a popular series of webisodes titled, "Hey Charlie, Do My Job!" in which he takes up a fan's occupation (e.g. working at Wendy's, or being an interior decorator) for a day, and currently works for UWM (United Wholesale Mortgage) as an Account Executive.

NBA career statistics

Regular season 

|-
| align="left" | 
| align="left" | Phoenix
| 5 || 0 || 8.4 || .273 || .000 || 1.000 || .8 || .4 || .0 || .0 || 1.6
|-
| align="left" | 
| align="left" | Dallas
| 2 || 0 || 1.0 || .000 || .000 || .000 || .5 || .0 || .0 || .0 || .0
|-
| align="left" | 
| align="left" | Milwaukee
| 59 || 6 || 21.7 || .439 || .423 || .708 || 2.0 || 2.2 || 1.0 || .1 || 8.4
|-
| align="left" | 
| align="left" | Milwaukee
| 82 || 64 || 34.7 || .437 || .352 || .780 || 2.9 || 3.0 || 1.2 || .1 || 13.5
|-
| align="left" | 
| align="left" | Milwaukee
| 68 || 5 || 23.9 || .381 || .341 || .805 || 2.5 || 3.1 || .8 || .0 || 7.6
|-
| align="left" | 
| align="left" | Milwaukee
| 70 || 23 || 25.5 || .414 || .363 || .825 || 1.9 || 2.2 || .7 || .1 || 8.4
|-
| align="left" | 
| align="left" | Milwaukee
| 71 || 39 || 22.7 || .381 || .365 || .716 || 1.9 || 1.5 || .6 || .2 || 6.5
|-
| align="left" | 
| align="left" | Golden State
| 19 || 0 || 9.0 || .279 || .286 || .500 || .9 || .7 || .3 || .0 || 1.7
|- class="sortbottom"
| style="text-align:center;" colspan="2"| Career
| 376 || 137 || 24.9 || .412 || .361 || .769 || 2.2 || 2.3 || .8 || .1 || 8.5

Playoffs 

|-
| align="left" | 2006
| align="left" | Milwaukee
| 5 || 0 || 21.6 || .395 || .455 || 1.000 || .6 || 1.4 || .6 || .4 || 9.2
|-
| align="left" | 2010
| align="left" | Milwaukee
| 3 || 0 || 2.7 || .000 || .000 || .000 || .0 || .0 || .0 || .0 || .0
|- class="sortbottom"
| style="text-align:center;" colspan="2"| Career
| 8 || 0 || 14.5 || .378 || .417 || 1.000 || .4 || .9 || .4 || .2 || 5.8

References

External links

Euroleague.net Player Profile
ACB.com Player Profile – Charlie Bell 
Legabasket.it Player Profile 

1979 births
Living people
African-American basketball players
All-American college men's basketball players
American expatriate basketball people in Italy
American expatriate basketball people in Spain
American men's basketball players
Basket Livorno players
Basketball coaches from Michigan
Basketball players from Flint, Michigan
CB Breogán players
Dallas Mavericks players
Golden State Warriors players
Iowa Wolves coaches
Juvecaserta Basket players
Lega Basket Serie A players
Liga ACB players
Michigan State Spartans men's basketball players
Milwaukee Bucks players
Pallacanestro Treviso players
Parade High School All-Americans (boys' basketball)
Phoenix Suns players
Shooting guards
Sportspeople from Flint, Michigan
Texas Legends coaches
Undrafted National Basketball Association players
Virtus Bologna players
United States men's national basketball team players
21st-century African-American sportspeople
20th-century African-American sportspeople